Jean Jamers (24 November 1907 – 12 March 1970) was a Belgian footballer. He played in two matches for the Belgium national football team from 1935 to 1936.

References

External links
 

1907 births
1970 deaths
Belgian footballers
Belgium international footballers
Place of birth missing
Association football midfielders